Irving Mosberg (May 6, 1908 – April 25, 1973) was an American lawyer and politician from New York.

Life
He was born on May 6, 1908, in New York City. He attended the public schools and Morris High School in the Bronx. He attended New York University School of Commerce for one year, and graduated from St. John's University School of Law in 1930. He was admitted to the bar in 1931. He practiced law in New York City, and lived in Laurelton, Queens.

Mosberg was an Assistant D.A. of Queens County when he was elected on January 14, 1958, to the New York State Senate, to fill the vacancy caused by the election of James J. Crisona as Borough President of Queens. Mosberg was re-elected several times, and remained in the State Senate until 1967, sitting in the 171st, 172nd, 173rd, 174th, 175th, 176th and 177th New York State Legislatures. In November 1967, Mosberg was elected to the New York City Civil Court.

He died on April 25, 1973.

Sources

1908 births
1973 deaths
Democratic Party members of the New York State Assembly
People from Laurelton, Queens
St. John's University School of Law alumni
New York (state) state court judges
20th-century American lawyers
20th-century American judges
20th-century American politicians